Oky is a different spelling of okay. It may also refer to:

People
 Oky Derry Andryan (born 1993), Indonesian soccer player

 Oky Harwanto, Indonesian rally driver, who participated in the 1996 World Rally Championship
 Viscompte "Oky" Octave, son of Comptesse Mary Lindell, died in German hands during WWII

Characters
 Oky Doky, a fictional character from The Adventures of Oky Doky

Places
 Oakey Army Aviation Centre (IATA airport code OKY), Oakey, Queensland, Australia
 Okayama (abbrev. Oky.), Okayama, Japan
 Okayama Prefecture (abbrev. OKY.), Japan
 Okayama International Circuit (abbrev. OKY), Mimasaka, Okayama Prefecture, Japan; a motorsports racecourse

See also

 Okie
 
 Okayama (disambiguation)
 Okay (disambiguation)
 Okie (disambiguation)
 OK (disambiguation)

Disambiguation pages